George Thompson Fairchild (October 6, 1838 – March 16, 1901) was an American educator and university president.

Fairchild was the son of Grandison Fairchild.  George was born on a farm in rural Lorain County, Ohio, and graduated with two degrees from Oberlin (AB 1862, MA 1865).

In 1865, Fairchild began his academic career as an instructor at State Agricultural College of Michigan (later Michigan State University).  The following year he was made professor of English, a position he retained through the 1860s and 1870s.  Fairchild was also a vice president of Michigan State, and in 1878 he served as acting president.

Kansas State Presidency 
In 1879, Fairchild was hired as the third President of Kansas State Agricultural College in Manhattan, Kansas (later Kansas State University).  He took office on December 1.  Notably, at the same time one brother, James Fairchild, was President of Oberlin College and another brother, Edward Henry Fairchild, was President of the progressive Berea College.

While at Kansas State, Fairchild stepped into an ongoing debate about the role of land grant colleges.  While some felt that the college should be limited to agricultural and mechanical arts, Fairchild reimplemented a classical liberal arts education at Kansas State.  He is credited with saying, "Our college exists not so much to make men farmers as to make farmers men."  Fairchild restored classics courses and brought in prominent professors.  He also bolstered the number and caliber of students at Kansas State, lifting attendance at the young school from 207 to 734 students during his tenure.  Ernest Fox Nichols, Philip Fox, Walter T. Swingle, Charles Lester Marlatt and David Fairchild (his son) were drawn to study at the school during this era.

President Fairchild retained his position at Kansas State until June 30, 1897.  Fairchild submitted his resignation that year in connection with a complete restructuring of the college by members of the Populist Party on the state Board of Regents, who terminated the majority of teaching faculty because the board disagreed with the university's direction. Fairchild penned a widely-read article in The American Journal of Sociology claiming that party politicians aimed to "capture" Kansas State Agricultural College "for a school of socialism." He alleged that Regent Christian B. Hoffman, recently returned from the utopian community at Topolobompo (Sinaloa, Mexico), was one of the primary instigators. Education leaders from around the country wrote supporting letters to the outgoing president.

Following his resignation from Kansas State, Fairchild became a professor of English and vice president at Berea College in Berea, Kentucky.  While at Berea, Macmillan Company published Fairchild's book Rural Wealth and Welfare: Economic Principles Illustrated and Applied in Farm Life in 1900.

Family life 
In 1863, Fairchild married Charlotte Pearly Halsted.  They had five children:

 Agnes Mary Fairchild Kirshner
 Edwin Milton
 Paul Halsted
 David Grandison, a noted biologist and plant explorer
 Anna Dalla Fairchild White

Legacy 
 Fairchild Hall, on the Kansas State campus, is named in his honor.  The building, completed during his tenure in 1894, is home to the K-State Graduate School.
 The Fairchild Theater, on the Michigan State campus, is also named in his honor.

References 

 Fairchild, David. (1947). The World Grows Round My Door: The Story of the Kampong, A Home on the Edge of the Tropics.
 "Fairchild, George Thompson." American National Biography (1999).
 "Fairchild, George Thompson." National Cyclopaedia of American Biography (1936).
Fairchild, George Thompson."Populism in a State Educational Institution, the Kansas State Agricultural College." American Journal of Sociology 3:3 (Nov. 1897).

External links 
Brief biography
Family biography
 
 

Presidents of Kansas State University
George
Oberlin College alumni
1838 births
1901 deaths